A footbag is a small, round bag usually filled with plastic pellets or sand, which is kicked into the air as part of a competitive game or as a display of dexterity. "Hacky Sack" is the name of a brand of footbag popular in the 1970s (currently owned by Wham-O), which has since become a generic trademark.

The most common game of footbag consists of two or more players standing in a circle and trying to keep the sack off the ground for as long as possible.

History
Footbag-like activities have existed for many years. The game is similar to traditional Asian games of kicking the shuttlecock, known as jianzi or chapteh. The game is also similar to some South East Asian games, such as chinlone, sepak takraw and sipa. This game is known as jegichagi (제기차기) in Korea. The Wu Style Tai Chi Chuan practice dates back to at least the 1930s, and French policemen are seen playing a shuttlecock game in the 1955 American film To Catch a Thief. The same principle is applied in football-playing countries in activities of freestyle football and keepie uppie.

The current Western incarnation of the sport was invented in 1972 by Mike Marshall and John Stalberger of Oregon City, Oregon, US with their "Hacky Sack" product, the rights to which are now owned by Wham-O. Although Marshall suffered a blood clot and fatal heart attack in 1975, Stalberger continued the business. It gained national popularity in the early 1980s, and Stalberger sold the title to Wham-O in 1983.

Equipment

For circle kicking, it is very common to use a crocheted footbag, which is usually filled with plastic beads. Casually, footbags are often differentiated as normal (indicating a plastic-pellet filling), or as "dirt bags" or "sand hacks" (indicating a sand filling).

In the freestyle footbag discipline, a 32-panel bag is the generally accepted standard (the number of panels on commercially available bags can range from 2 to 120 panels). Stitchers generally use Plastic Poly Pellets, sand, BB's, steel shot, lead shot, seed bead, or tungsten shot as filler. Most professional stitchers use a custom combination of different fillers to make the bag play better. Bags usually weigh between 40 and 65 grams, depending on the type of filler and amount of filler used. 32-panel bags do not stall as easily as a "dirt bag" or "sand hack", but set truer from the foot, allowing for more complex tricks. While these bags can last a long time with proper care, they are quite fragile relative to their more common crocheted cousins.

The footbag net discipline uses a distinct bag, characterized by a harder outer surface than other footbags. These bags are not suitable for freestyle, and vice versa.

There are also several novelty products available, including glow in the dark, chain mail, and even flame retardant bags that can be set on fire and played with. The fire footbag has been banned in South Australia.

Shoes 

Most advanced freestylers wear various styles and brands of tennis shoes, the most popular being the Adidas Rod Laver tennis shoe.

Several shoe modifications are common in freestyle footbag. In order to make toe stalling easier, many players use special lacing patterns that pull apart the sides of the shoe near the toe area, creating a broad, rimmed platform. Modified lacing is augmented by cutting away the stitching that joins the row of eyelets to the toe. The area that is created by completing these modifications is called a toe box.

Shoes can be further modified for freestyle footbag by removing layers of fabric from the inside, outside, and toe surfaces. These modifications are advantageous because they allow players to more accurately feel the bag on their foot.

Games

Circle kicking

Circle kicking is the most common game played with a footbag, and is often what people mean when they use the term "hacky sack". Players stand in a circle and keep the bag moving around the circle, with the goal of keeping the bag from touching the ground. There are a variety of terms used by different groups of players to note when the footbag has been touched by every member of the circle.

The game starts when one player picks up the sack and tosses it to the chest of another player, who allows it to fall to their feet so they can kick it, and play begins. Play continues until the sack falls to the ground, then a player picks up the sack and the game resumes. The object of the game is to keep the sack off the ground for as long as possible. If every player gets a touch to the sack before it hits the ground, it is called a 'hack'. If every player gets two touches before the sack hits the ground, it is called a 'double-hack' and so on and so forth.

Circle kick is generally accompanied by an unwritten set of etiquette guidelines designed to keep the game fun, friendly, and open to everyone including new players. The most basic rule is to respect all other players. Some other general guidelines include picking up the footbag after you drop it or kick it away, rather than having someone else retrieve it; not serving the footbag to yourself; not spitting in the circle; and not hogging the footbag (often called jestering, or the player may be called a hack-hog) and making sure to pass the bag to players who have not gotten it recently. Most circles are very open to new players and will not ostracize anyone for being less coordinated or well practiced than the rest. Some circles have an unwritten rule that there is no apologizing when a person drops the footbag. This guideline is designed to keep the new players from feeling as if it is their fault that the game is slow, and it keeps the experienced players from having to constantly reassure the new players that it is not their fault. If the footbag becomes entangled in an obstacle from which it cannot be retrieved (i.e. a tree) with a legal move, this is known as being 'lost in the doritos' and play can continue without having to begin again.

Freestyle footbag

Freestyle footbag is a sport in which the object is to perform tricks with the bag. The ending position of the footbag on one trick becomes the starting position of the footbag on the next trick. Tricks are created by combining different components between contacts with the bag (contacts can be either stalls or kicks, though stalls are more frequent). Components include spins, dexterities (using a leg to circle or cross the footbag's path in mid-air), jumps, and ducks (letting the footbag pass a few inches above the neck). Contacts are usually on the inside of the foot behind the opposite support leg (Clipper Stall) or on the toe, however, many inventive possibilities remain and are used to create an endless list of tricks. A partial list of freestyle footbag tricks can be found at the official Footbag WorldWide Information Service.

Various styles have developed as the sport has become more popular. Players can choreograph routines to music, alone or in pairs, executing difficult moves in sync with the music—the result is something like a cross between rhythmic gymnastics and figure skating.

There is an annual footbag world championships held each year. The current freestyle world champion in singles category is Jan Weber, of Czech Republic.

Footbag net

In footbag net, players (either playing individually or with a partner) volley a footbag back and forth over a five-foot-high net. This game combines elements of tennis, badminton, and volleyball. The court dimensions and layout are similar to those of badminton; the scoring is similar to the old scoring system in volleyball (a player must be serving to score); and serves must be diagonal, as in tennis. Footbag net games can be played to 11 or 15 points, although the winners must win by at least two points. Rallies in footbag net look a lot like volleyball (e.g., bump, set, and spike), with players spiking from an inverted position in mid-air (over the net) and opponents often digging very fast spikes into bumps or sets. Play in footbag net is very similar to Sepak Takraw. However, in footbag net, it is an "upper-body foul" if the footbag touches any part of a player's body above the shin.

Hacky attack

Hacky Attack is a particular footbag discipline, played by two teams made up of two players each. It is practiced on a field, generally of sand, formed by a rectangle of 10 x 15 meters. One of the two players, the pitcher, tries to hit the opposing pitcher with the ball (footbag), who instead tries to avoid being hit. The other player, the catcher, has instead the task of picking up the ball and passing it to his thrower. When a pitcher is hit, he switches positions with his teammate. The first team to reach 15 points (the point is scored each time the opposing pitcher is hit) wins the game.

Hit the man
This particular discipline, practiced mainly in Northern Italy, was founded in 2009 by some university students and consists in hitting the opponent with precise and spectacular shots, on the street or in public places. In this game, footbag is commonly called Street Ball, due to its ability to play in the crowd.

Other

Basse An old Norwegian foot bag game reminiscent of bag ball, where a player defends their circle. Usually, there are five to six players - where everyone plays against everyone. The aim of the game is for a player to defend their own field while attempting to land the Basse inside the field of an opponent. There are World Cup rules, Series Games, and Cup Games.

Buce A game in which players in a team must juggle the footbag across a field to the opponent's half and score a goal, by kicking the footbag into a small, cylindrical container, usually a bin or pot plant. The sport was invented in Australia in 2007 and is played there with two annual national competitions.

Hack Slap A game played with 4, 6, 8 or more people and the object is to keep the 'footbag' in the air by any means necessary, excluding hands. When someone fails to keep the footbag in the air, hit it with an upward trajectory, or the 'footbag' fails to make it to an opponents square, they are eliminated.

Footbag Golf A game in which a player must kick the bag towards a designated target (18 inches in diameter and 18 inches off the ground) while navigating the course. A course is usually made up of 9 or 18 holes, and the distance between the tee and target varies from hole to hole. The game can include any number of players. A player begins a hole by teeing off from a six foot by six foot box by tossing the bag in the air and kicking it with the intention of getting the footbag as close to the target as possible. Where the footbag lands and comes to a complete stop is called the lie. After all players have teed off, the player furthest from the target marks the lie and tosses the bag for another kick. All kicks must be made behind the lie and a player cannot move past the lie until the kick is completed. Once all the players have successfully kicked their bags into the target, they may move on to the next hole.

HorseA game that can be played with any number of players and is a great way to improve one's freestyle. One of the players performs any freestyle move they choose, then passes it on to the next player who then attempts to perform the same move. If the player performs the move correctly then that they perform a different move of their choice and then pass it on. If they fail to do the move then they get a letter "H" (if they miss again on the next round they get an "O") and passes it on to the next player who chooses a new trick. Once a player spells the word "Horse" they are out.

Kick Back A game at which a player can kick the footbag against the backstop of a handball court, alone or with others. It needs a very firm footbag to bounce back. A simple score can be kept or not.

Killer A game similar to War. The hacky sack is kicked around and after a certain number of kicks, a player can kick the sack at another player, trying to peg them. If the hacky sack hits them they are out unless they can hack the sack back in to the circle before it hits the ground. Self-serving, tossing the sack to yourself, is often banned in this game and if done the round is stopped and the rule breaker is pegged, thrown, with the sack.

Knockout A game that can be played with any number of players, in which players are eliminated by failure to hit the hack. The hack is passed around randomly to any player, and the goal is to keep it going indefinitely; if the hack lands on the ground near another player who could have hit it (within 2 feet of him/her), that player is eliminated for the failure. If the hack lands drastically out of range of any player, then the player who kicked it out of bounds is eliminated. Some groups can apply a more strict rule where, when the hack drops, any player who lifts their foot off the ground in an attempt to kick it is eliminated.

Number CatchA game where any number of players (best played with 3 or 4) have to alternate turns hitting the footbag as many times as possible and must catch it for the points to count if the bag is dropped the player must subtract the points from their score. This game may be played to a certain score or a certain time to get as many points as possible.

NumbersA game in which players form a circle and the person who starts kicks the hack once. Then the second person kicks it twice and so on and so forth. If the hack touches the ground before the player achieves their number, the player gets one chance to start where they left off. If the player does not achieve their number, they pass the footbag on to the next player, and if they achieve that number the previous player is out.

SharkA game where two or more players can play. The goal is to hit the sack a previously set number of times before a player catches it and says: "shark." When the person says "shark" the other players must stay where they are, and the "shark" has the ability to throw it at any player. If a player is hit, the player is out or has a point that goes against their score. Last player standing wins. When a player says "shark", the others players can move only one foot once to reposition themself. It is common to use that one move to dodge the sack.

War A game for any number of players. The footbag is served and after a predetermined number (usually 3) of kicks (whether by one person, or collectively as a group) everyone tries to catch it. The person who catches the footbag throws it at one of the other players who try to either dodge or catch it. If the footbag hits someone they are out, but if they catch it the person who threw it is out. The game can be played with any number of outs. Also known by the names "Pelt", "Three Balls of Fire", "Three Hit Kill", "Three Hack Wack", "Applesauce", "Red Dot", and "God".

Rules 
There are a lot of variations of hacky sack therefore there are no standardized rules to govern each version.  There are however unwritten rules for example in circle kicking, players should only serve the ball to players standing next to them rather than serving to themselves. If a player also drops the ball, he is responsible for retrieving it. To complete the circle and get a hack, the ball should pass through all the players without touching the ground. One circle is called a hack, double circle is called double hack and so forth.   In the footbag net, only two kicks are allowed per side for singles and three kicks per side for doubles.

See also 
 Basse
 Bean bag
 Chinlone
 Cuju
 International Footbag Players' Association
 Keepie uppie
 Kemari
 Jianzi

References 

1980s fads and trends
Brands that became generic
Footbag
Games and sports introduced in 1972
Wham-O brands